BGE may refer to:

 Baltimore Gas and Electric
 Basic Global English, a concept of global English initiated by German linguist Joachim Grzega
 Battleground Europe, a video game
 Beyond Good and Evil (disambiguation)
 Beyond Good and Evil, a philosophical book by Friedrich Nietzsche
 Beyond Good & Evil (video game), a 2003 video game
 Beyond Good and Evil 2, the unreleased sequel
 Blender Game Engine, the built-in Game Engine in Blender
 Bord Gáis Éireann, now split into
 Bord Gáis Energy, a utility that supplies gas and electricity and boiler services to customers in the Republic of Ireland
 Ervia, a multi-utility company distributing pipeline natural gas, water services and dark fibre services in Ireland
 Bread Gang Entertainment, rap label in Memphis including artists like Moneybagg Yo and Finese 2Tymez.
 Broad Green railway station, Liverpool, England (National Rail station code)
 Basic Income Alliance (Bündnis Grundeinkommen), a German single-issue political party
Bundesgesellschaft für Endlagerung, a German federally-owned company